Countess Jadwiga Dzieduszycka (1867–1941) was a Polish noble lady.

Family
Jadwiga was married to Prince Witold Leon Czartoryski on 21 February 1889 in Lwów. They had twelve children together:
 Maria Anna Czartoryska
 Anna Maria Czartoryska
 Kazimierz Jerzy Czartoryski
 Jerzy Piotr Czartoryski
 Włodzimierz Alfons Czartoryski
 Jan Franciszek Czartoryski
 Roman Jacek Czartoryski
 Stanisław Ignacy Czartoryski
 Elżbieta Czartoryska
 Adam Michał Czartoryski
 Witold Tadeusz Czartoryski 
 Piotr Michał Czartoryski

References

1867 births
1941 deaths
20th-century Polish nobility
Jadwiga